Perseverance is a rural locality in the Toowoomba Region, Queensland, Australia.

Geography 
Perseverance is on the Darling Downs in southern Queensland.

The locality is crossed from east to west by the Esk–Hampton Road.  Upper Creekbrook Creek forms part of the eastern boundary of Perseverance.

History 
Perseverance Creek Provisional School opened on 10 November 1880. On 1 January 1909 it became Perseverance Creek State School. It closed briefly in 1925 to 1926 due to low student numbers. It permanently closed in 1944.

In 1914 land was purchased by the Methodists with the intention to build a church.

References

Toowoomba Region
Localities in Queensland